Heffer may refer to:

 Richard Heffer (born 1946), British television and film actor
 Simon Heffer (born 1960),  British journalist, author and political commentator.
 Heffer Wolfe, a character from the Nicktoon Rocko's Modern Life

See also
 Heffers bookshop
 Heifer (disambiguation)